Dub Kweli is a mashup album of Talib Kweli and various classic reggae samples that was mixed and produced by New York producer Max Tannone. The album was officially released to download on August 29, 2010.

Style
Editing tracks from popular dub music, like Scotty, Lee "Scratch" Perry, Prince Jammy, and Scientist and laying a cappella tracks from Talib Kweli, Tannone mixed the tracks using the same concept as he did with Mos Dub. He released the album almost immediately after finishing mixing it.

On August 10, 2010 via his Twitter, Tannone confirmed a sequel to the album Mos Dub would be released, but did not specify any details regarding it. Nine days later, he announced that he would release the album on September 1, or sooner if the Jaydiohead Facebook page fan count had reached 10,000. Dub Kweli was released as a free download on August 29, 2010, off of the official Dub Kweli website.

Reception
Dub Kweli has generally received positive reviews. It has been well received by fans of his previous remixes, as well as by fans who do not typically like reggae music. In the same vein as Mos Dub, Dub Kweli has been described as being an album well fit for summertime listening by New York Magazine, as "Kweli's rhymes work well with the laid-back reggae backbeats." Hip-hop site Okayplayer described the album as "real clean." Adam Horovitz, also known as Ad-Rock of the Beastie Boys, voiced his support of the album in his personal blog.

Talib Kweli himself acknowledged Dub Kweli by retweeting about it twice on Twitter.

Tracks

References

External links
 Official website of Dub Kweli

2010 remix albums
Talib Kweli albums
Reggae remix albums
Self-released albums
Mashup albums